Night of the Living Dead 3D or Night of the Living DE3D is a 2006 horror film made in 3D. It is the second remake of the 1968 horror classic Night of the Living Dead. The first remake was released in 1990 and was directed by Tom Savini from a revised screenplay by George A. Romero. Unlike the first remake, no one involved with the original is involved with this version. The original film was never properly copyrighted, and so it has fallen into the public domain, making this remake possible with no permission from the original's creators (the original movie can actually be seen playing on TV in this version).

It was released on DVD on October 9, 2007 in two separate versions, the original 3D format which includes four pairs of anaglyph (red/blue) 3D glasses, and a 2D version that does not require nor include any 3D glasses.

Plot

In this latest interpretation, the characters Barb and her brother Johnny arrive late for their aunt's funeral and find the cemetery overrun with zombies. After Johnny abandons her, Barb flees the cemetery and is rescued by Ben, a local college student. The two seek refuge in the nearby farmhouse of the Cooper family (Henry & Hellie Cooper, Henry's daughter and Hellie's stepdaughter Karen, farmhand Owen, and farmhand Tom and his girlfriend Judy), and attempt to live through the night along with other survivors, including the pyrophobic mortician, Gerald Tovar, Jr. As Barb and Ben attempt to convince the Cooper family that the zombies are heading to the house, Tom and Judy are attacked while having sex in the barn. After hearing Judy's screams, Barb and the rest of the household attempt to save her, but they are too late. After recovering Henry's guns from his safe they begin to look for a missing Karen, she is later found by her mother having turned undead. She comes down the stairs as her father tries to block her from being shot by Ben. She bites her father in the neck and is promptly shot by Ben at his first opportunity. Later Tovar arrives fighting through the dead with a shovel, he explains what is happening. Owen the farmhand finally succumbs to zombie bite and becomes undead. While attempting to eat Ben Owen is killed by Tovar with a shovel.

Barb and Ben leave with Tovar to what they believe is safety, while Henry and Hellie barricade themselves upstairs. Distraught over the death of their child and the eventual reanimation of Henry, they decide to commit suicide, and do so.

After reaching his car, Tovar knocks Ben out and loads him into the trunk of his car. He chases Barb back to his house and reveals that he was the one who brought the zombies back to life, even so much as bringing his own father back and feeding him with his own blood. Barb sets the reanimated corpse of Tovar’s father on fire, Tovar is afraid of fire and unable to stop the small flame on his hand from engulfing him. Barb flees to Tovar’s car but Tovar catches her and punches her knocking her out. He then brings her back to the mortuary along with Ben still in the trunk. Ultimately, Tovar plans to have Barb reborn as a zombie. While handling Barb, Tovar doesn’t notice the group of zombies bind him and shoves him into them, she then rushes back to the car. Barb and Ben escape and lock the other zombies in the garage. Ben realizes that he has been impaled with a tire iron, but is apparently unharmed; moments later, he transforms into a zombie. Barb uses the last bullet to kill him, and the zombies break through the gate chasing her.

Cast
Brianna Brown as Barb
Joshua DesRoces as Ben 
Sid Haig as Gerald Tovar, Jr.
Greg Travis as Henry Cooper 
Johanna Black as Hellie Cooper
Adam Chambers as Owen
Ken Ward as Johnny 
Alynia Phillips as Karen Cooper 
Max Williams as Tom 
Cristin Michele as Judy

Critical reception
The film received poor reviews with Rotten Tomatoes showing an 18% rating and Metacritic describing reviews as "generally unfavorable." Justin Chang of Variety said the film "feels like a cynical attempt to cash in on a classic." Steve Barton of Dread Central said of the film "Failing as both a homage and a gimmick, Night of the Living Dead 3D only succeeds in taking us to new dimensions of boredom" and gave it one and a half stars.

Prequel
A prequel, titled Night of the Living Dead 3D: Re-Animation, was released in 2012 starring Andrew Divoff, Jeffrey Combs, Denice Duff and directed by Jeff Broadstreet.

Soundtrack
The end credits theme is entitled Control which is part of Radford'''s album Sleepwalker'' which was released in 2004.

References

External links
 
 
 
 
 

2006 films
2006 horror films
2006 3D films
2006 independent films
Night of the Living Dead (film series)
American 3D films
Remakes of American films
American zombie films
American independent films
Horror film remakes
2000s English-language films
2000s American films